The following lists events that happened during 1941 in Australia.

Incumbents

Monarch – George VI
Governor-General – Alexander Hore-Ruthven, 1st Baron Gowrie
Prime Minister – Robert Menzies (until 28 August), then Arthur Fadden (until 7 October), then John Curtin
Chief Justice – Sir John Latham

State Premiers
Premier of New South Wales – Alexander Mair (until 16 May), then William McKell
Premier of Queensland – William Forgan Smith
Premier of South Australia – Thomas Playford
Premier of Tasmania – Robert Cosgrove
Premier of Victoria – Albert Dunstan
Premier of Western Australia – John Willcock

State Governors
Governor of New South Wales – John Loder, 2nd Baron Wakehurst
Governor of Queensland – Sir Leslie Orme Wilson
Governor of South Australia – Sir Malcolm Barclay-Harvey
Governor of Tasmania – Sir Ernest Clark
Governor of Victoria – Sir Winston Dugan
Governor of Western Australia – none appointed

Events
25 March – The Women's Auxiliary Australian Air Force (WAAAF) is formed.
31 March – The Siege of Tobruk begins.
7 April – The Women's Royal Australian Naval Service (WRANS) is formed.
10 May – A general election is held in New South Wales. The ALP led by William McKell defeats the incumbent United Australia Party and Premier Alexander Mair.
12 May – The Daily Mirror newspaper is first published in Sydney.
30 June – HMAS Waterhen sinks off Libya – the first Australian naval vessel lost in the war.
3 October – Prime Minister Arthur Fadden resigns following the rejection of his budget by two independent MPs.
7 October – John Curtin is sworn in as Prime Minister after Arthur Fadden's government loses majority support in the House of Representatives.
11 November – The Australian War Memorial is opened in Canberra.
19 November – The light cruiser HMAS Sydney engages the German auxiliary cruiser Kormoran in an hour-long battle off the coast of Western Australia. Both ships are sunk, the Sydney going down with 645 crew.
9 December – Australia declares war on Japan, and the Axis powers of Finland, Hungary and Romania.
13 December – A general election is held in Tasmania. The Labor Party led by Robert Cosgrove is returned to power.

Arts and literature

 William Dargie wins the Archibald Prize with his portrait of Sir James Elder, KBE
 The Timeless Land by Eleanor Dark is published.

Sport
30 August – St. George win the 1941 NSWRFL season for their first premiership after the club's founding in 1920, defeating Eastern Suburbs 31–14. North Sydney finish in last place, claiming the wooden spoon.
27 September – Melbourne wins the 45th VFL Premiership, defeating Essendon 19.13 (127) to 13.20 (98).
4 November – Skipton wins the Melbourne Cup.
 Velocity wins the Caulfield Cup
 Beau Vite wins the Cox Plate
 The Sheffield Shield is not contested due to war

Births
23 January – Jock R. Anderson, economist and academic
29 January – Maggie Kirkpatrick, actress
4 February – Russell Cooper, Premier of Queensland (1989)
2 March – John Cornell, film producer (died 2021)
11 March – Kim Santow, NSW Supreme Court judge (died 2008)
29 March – Michael Thornhill, film producer, screenwriter and film director (died 2022)
31 March – Faith Leech, swimmer (died 2013)
10 April – Wendy Fatin, politician
13 April – Alan Jones, radio personality
17 April – Bill Landeryou, politician (died 2019)
24 April – John Williams, classical guitarist
6 May – Peter Corrigan, architect (died 2016)
11 May – Ian Redpath, cricketer
18 May – Lobby Loyde, rock music guitarist (died 2007)
31 May – Julian Croft, poet
4 June – Kenneth G. Ross, playwright
8 June – George Pell, cardinal (died 2023)
23 June – Margaret Hamilton, publisher and author (died 2022)
24 June – Graham McKenzie, cricketer
25 June – Kenneth Walker, cricketer
28 June – Harry Quick, politician
1 July 
 Alf Duval,  rower
 Denis Michael Rohan, Australian citizen who, on August 21, 1969, set fire to the pulpit of the Al-Aqsa Mosque, in Jerusalem (died 1995)
9 July – Jan Lehane, tennis player 
21 July – Ron Corry, football (soccer) player, coach
31 July – Heather McKay, squash player
28 August – Tony Barry, actor (died 2022)
1 September – Graeme Langlands, rugby league footballer who played in the 1950s, 1960s and 1970s. and coached in the 1970s (died 2018)
22 September – Murray Bail, writer
27 September – Gay Kayler, country music singer
3 October – John Elliott, businessman (died 2021)
5 October – Earle Bailey, politician
14 October – David Kemp, politician
16 October – Genevieve Lloyd, philosopher and feminist
25 October – Helen Reddy, singer (died 2020)
28 October – Fred Chaney, WA politician
7 November – Willi Sawall, race walker
16 November – Max Gillies, actor
13 December – Dixie Willis, middle distance runner
15 December – Richard Neville, writer (died 2016)

Deaths

 20 January – Raimund Pechotsch, musical composer (born in Austria-Hungary) (b. 1864)
 5 February – Banjo Paterson, bush poet, journalist and author (b. 1864)
 18 March – Harry Boan, Western Australian politician and businessman (b. 1860)
 1 April – Jack Chamberlain, cricketer (b. 1884)
 12 April – James Boyd, Victorian politician (born in the United Kingdom) (b. 1867)
 15 April – Emily Pelloe, botanical illustrator (b. 1878)
 4 May – Chris McKivat, Olympic rugby union and league player (b. 1880)
 8 May – Alexander Hay, New South Wales politician (born in New Zealand) (b. 1865)
 15 June – John Lynch, New South Wales politician (b. 1862)
 24 June – Sir Francis Anderson, philosopher (born in the United Kingdom) (b. 1858)
 1 July – Francis Birtles, adventurer (b. 1881)
 7 July – Randolph Bedford, Queensland politician and writer (b. 1868)
 27 July – James Ronald, Victorian politician (born in the United Kingdom) (b. 1861)
 31 July – Ron Barassi Sr., Australian rules footballer (Melbourne) and soldier (died in Libya) (b. 1913)
 1 August – James Drake, Queensland politician (born in the United Kingdom) (b. 1850)
 23 August – Jack O'Connor, cricketer (b. 1875)
 30 August – Gregan McMahon, actor and theatrical producer (b. 1874)
 31 August – Sir Thomas Bavin, 24th Premier of New South Wales (born in New Zealand) (b. 1874)
 1 September – Millice Culpin, Queensland politician (born in the United Kingdom) (b. 1846)
 5 September – George Marchant, soft drink manufacturer and philanthropist (born in the United Kingdom) (b. 1857)
 1 October – Sir John Longstaff, artist (b. 1861)
 18 November – Chris Watson, 3rd Prime Minister of Australia (born in Chile) (b. 1867)
 19 November – Joseph Burnett, naval captain (b. 1899)
 28 November - Elwyn Roy King, fighter ace and military officer (b. 1894)
 22 December – Cyril Cameron, Tasmanian politician and soldier (b. 1857)

See also
 List of Australian films of the 1940s

References

 
Australia
Years of the 20th century in Australia